Rye House Kart Circuit is a kart circuit, in Hoddesdon, Hertfordshire, England, and is adjacent to the Rye House Stadium. The circuit is one of the oldest in the country, and has been used by drivers including Jenson Button, Anthony Davidson and Lewis Hamilton.

Hoddesdon Kart Club
The Hoddesdon Kart Club is an approved MSA club, which holds its events usually on the third Sunday of every month. Events are run year round, running from February to December. In September, the club run an event called the London Cup. This has been televised on Motors TV in previous years, except for 2010. The event attracts competitors mainly from the Super 1 National Kart Championships as well as other drivers from National kart clubs and associations.

Circuit improvements
Since 2003, the circuit has undergone some major refurbishments. Early that year, the track was resurfaced, and since then a new cafe and hospitality area have been added. In between the March and April MSA meeting, a new covered grandstand was built at Stadium Bend, the fastest corner on the circuit. The grass on the exit of both hairpins one and two has been replaced with brickwork, in an effort to reduce the water-logging which plagues the circuit due to the close proximity of the wetlands and surrounding lakes and rivers. The new race control building was completed in late 2009. The track was again resurfaced in early 2022. New drainage was added along with extended asphalt run off areas at the exits of turn 6 and 7.

In popular culture

The track featured prominently in the 1964 movie 'Go Kart Go' starring Dennis Waterman and Wilfrid Brambell.

References

Kart circuits
Motorsport venues in England
Sports venues in Hertfordshire
Hoddesdon